This is a list of Cowdenbeath Football Club's seasons since their admission to the Scottish Football League in 1905–06 to the present day. The list details Cowdenbeath's record in major league and cup competitions and includes the top scorers for each season where available.

Seasons

Key

 P = Played
 W = Games won
 D = Games drawn
 L = Games lost
 F = Goals for
 A = Goals against
 Pts = Points
 Pos = Final position

 DNQ=Did Not Qualify 
 NH=Not Held
 PR1=Preliminary Round 1
 R1 = Round 1
 R2 = Round 2
 R3 = Round 3
 R4 = Round 4
 R5 = Round 5
 SR = Supplementary Round
 QF = Quarter-finals
 SF = Semi-finals

 CFL    = Central Football League
 EFL    = Eastern Football League
 ED     = Emergency League Eastern Division
 SFL 1 = Scottish First Division
 SFL 2 = Scottish Second Division
 SFL 3 = Scottish Third Division
 SFL B = Southern Football League Division B
 Champ = Scottish Championship
 League 1 = Scottish League One

Notes

References

Seasons
 
Cowdenbeath